Vernon Decatur Stephens (October 23, 1920 – November 3, 1968) was an American professional baseball player. He played in Major League Baseball as a shortstop from  through . An eight-time All-Star, Stephens was notable for being the  American League home run champion and was a three-time American League RBI champion. Nicknamed "Little Slug", "Junior", and "Buster", Stephens batted and threw right-handed. He was inducted into the Boston Red Sox Hall of Fame in 2006.

Baseball career

Stephens was born in McAlister, New Mexico while his parents were en route from Oklahoma to California. He attended Long Beach Polytechnic High School in Long Beach, California.

One of the strongest-hitting shortstops in major league history, Stephens compiled a .286 batting average with 247 home runs and 1,174 RBI in 1,720 games. Breaking with American Major League baseball, Stephens signed a five-year contract with the Mexican League in 1946. He had been in Mexico only a few days when his father, a minor league umpire, and the Browns scout Jack Fournier drove down and brought him back to the United States.

In 1944, Stephens led the American League with 109 runs batted in as he led the Browns to their first and only World Series appearance in St. Louis. He also led the league with 24 home runs in 1945. After the 1947 season, he was traded along with Jack Kramer to the Boston Red Sox, but later, after a brief stint with the Chicago White Sox, returned to the Browns in 1953, their last season in St. Louis. Stephens was the only member of the pennant-winning 1944 St. Louis Browns who played with the Baltimore Orioles when the Browns moved to Baltimore in 1954.

Stephens played five years with the Boston Red Sox from 1948 to 1952. Ted Williams said that he was the most effective of those who followed him in the batting order. In 1949 he batted in 159 runs (tied with Williams for the league lead) and hit 39 home runs, second only to Williams's 43. No other player in the American League had more than 24. Second baseman Bobby Doerr, who was lionized in David Halberstam's book Summer of '49, hit 18 home runs. 
In August 2008, he was named as one of the ten former players who began their careers before 1943 to be considered by the Veterans Committee for induction into the National Baseball Hall of Fame and Museum in 2009. He was not selected.

Death
Vern Stephens died of a heart attack in Long Beach, California at 48 years of age.

Highlights
 8-time All-Star (1943–44, 1945 [non-official game], 1946, 1948–51)
 Six times in the Top 10 in MVP voting (1942–45, 1948–49)
 Led the American League in home runs during 1945
 Three times led the American League in RBI (1944, 1949–50)
 Collected 440 RBI within three consecutive seasons (1948–50)
 Three times in the Top 10 in batting average (1942–43, 1946)
 Twice led the American League in games played (1948–49)
 Was inducted into the Boston Red Sox Hall of Fame in 2006
 Only man to play for the 1944 American League Champion St. Louis Browns and the Baltimore Orioles, the team the Browns franchise became after it moved to Baltimore in 1954
 Holds the MLB record for RBI in a season by a shortstop, with 159 in 1949
 Became the first shortstop to hit 30 home runs in a season, with 39 in 1949
 Attended Polytechnic High School, Long Beach, California (also attended by Tony Gwynn, Chase Utley, Milton Bradley, etc.)

See also
 Baseball Hall of Fame balloting, 2009
 List of Major League Baseball career home run leaders
 List of Boston Red Sox awards
 List of Major League Baseball career runs scored leaders
 List of Major League Baseball career runs batted in leaders
 List of Major League Baseball annual runs batted in leaders
 List of Major League Baseball annual home run leaders

References

External links

Baseball Almanac

1920 births
1968 deaths
American League All-Stars
American League home run champions
American League RBI champions
Baltimore Orioles players
Baseball players from New Mexico
Boston Red Sox players
Chicago White Sox players
Johnstown Johnnies players
Major League Baseball shortstops
Mayfield Browns players
People from Quay County, New Mexico
St. Louis Browns players
San Antonio Missions players
Baseball players from Long Beach, California
Springfield Browns players
Toledo Mud Hens players
Long Beach Polytechnic High School alumni